This article is a list of the active and all-time National Hockey League (NHL) franchise post-season appearance, post-season series win, Stanley Cup Finals and Stanley Cup droughts up to and including the 2022 Stanley Cup playoffs. Those teams which have never made it in franchise history are listed by the season that they entered the league, either as a new franchise or when they merged into the NHL from the disbanded World Hockey Association (WHA) league.

Note: These lists do not include the cancelled 2004–05 NHL season when calculating "number of seasons".

Among the current thirty-two active NHL teams, twelve have never won the Stanley Cup, with the oldest of them being the Vancouver Canucks and the Buffalo Sabres (50 seasons). The longest Stanley Cup drought in NHL history belongs to the Toronto Maple Leafs (54 seasons), breaking a tie with the New York Rangers. New York ended their drought in 1994, while Toronto's drought is still active, as they have not made the Finals since winning the last Stanley Cup before the expansion era. Five teams have never reached the Stanley Cup Finals, with the oldest of them being the Winnipeg Jets/Arizona Coyotes franchise (41 seasons). Toronto's active 54-season drought from the Finals is the longest in NHL history. In 2010, the Chicago Blackhawks ended what was the second-longest Stanley Cup championship drought at 47 seasons (now the sixth-longest). The end of that drought was the first of three consecutive years in which one of the eleven longest such droughts was broken (Chicago Blackhawks in 2010, Boston Bruins in 2011, and Los Angeles Kings in 2012).

The Toronto Maple Leafs have the longest active playoff series win drought at 17 seasons. The Florida Panthers had the longest playoff series win drought in league history at 24 seasons. The Buffalo Sabres have the longest active drought for missing the playoffs at 11 consecutive seasons.  It is also a league record.

Longest active droughts

Post-season appearance droughts

A postseason appearance drought is continued by not making the NHL playoffs after the regular season. Since the first round of the playoffs normally consists of eight series (sixteen teams) and there were thirty-two active teams in the NHL during the 2021–22 season, there are sixteen teams that did not make the most recent playoffs on this list.

Post-season series win droughts

A post-season series win drought is continued either by not making the playoffs in a season or by making the playoffs in a season and subsequently losing the first round series. Since the first round of the NHL playoffs consists of eight series (sixteen teams), there will be twenty-four teams in this list – the sixteen teams that do not qualify for the post-season, plus the eight teams that lose their first round series.

The other eight teams – the Calgary Flames, Carolina Hurricanes, Colorado Avalanche, Edmonton Oilers, Florida Panthers, New York Rangers, St. Louis Blues, and Tampa Bay Lightning – all won a post-season series in the 2022 Stanley Cup playoffs.

Stanley Cup Finals droughts

This is a list of the teams and the number of seasons since they have reached the Stanley Cup Finals. This list does not include the two teams that made the 2022 Stanley Cup Finals: the Colorado Avalanche and the Tampa Bay Lightning.

1 includes 17 seasons for Winnipeg Jets (1979–80 through to 1995–96) + 25 seasons for Phoenix/Arizona Coyotes (1996–97 through to 2021–22)
2 includes 11 seasons for Atlanta Thrashers (1999–2000 through to 2010–11) + 11 seasons for Winnipeg Jets (2011–12 through to 2021–22)

Stanley Cup droughts

This is a list of the teams and the number of seasons since they have won the Stanley Cup. This list does not include the most recent Stanley Cup champions: the Colorado Avalanche.

1 includes 17 seasons for Winnipeg Jets (1979–80 through to 1995–96) + 25 seasons for Phoenix/Arizona Coyotes (1996–97 through to 2021–22)
2 includes 11 seasons for Atlanta Thrashers (1999–2000 through to 2010–11) + 11 seasons for Winnipeg Jets (2011–12 through to 2021–22)

Closest approaches without winning

1 includes Preliminary Rounds from 1974–75 through to 1980–81, Division Semi-Finals from 1981–82 through to 1992–93 and Conference Quarterfinals from 1993–94 through to 2012–13
2 includes Quarter-Finals from 1967–68 through to 1980–81, Division Finals from 1981–82 through to 1992–93 and Conference Semifinals from 1993–94 through to 2012–13
3 includes Semi-Finals up to and including 1980–81 and Stanley Cup Semifinals in 2021–22
4 includes 17 seasons for Winnipeg Jets (1979–80 through to 1995–96) + 25 seasons for Arizona Coyotes/Phoenix Coyotes (1996–97 through to 2021–22).
5 includes 11 seasons for Atlanta Thrashers (1999–2000 through to 2010–11) + 11 seasons for Winnipeg Jets (2011–12 through to 2021–22).

Longest all-time droughts

Post-season appearance droughts

1 no post-season occurred in 2005, due to the 2004–05 NHL Lockout
2 includes 4 seasons for Colorado Rockies (1978–79 through to 1981–82) + 5 seasons for New Jersey Devils (1982–83 through to 1986–87)
3 franchise dissolved in 1978 in a merger with the Minnesota North Stars (current Dallas Stars)
4 includes 6 seasons for California Golden Seals (1970–71 through to 1975–76) + 2 seasons for Cleveland Barons (1976–77, 1977–78)
5 includes 4 seasons for Atlanta Thrashers (2007–08 through to 2010–11) + 3 seasons for Winnipeg Jets (2011–12 through to 2013–14)
6 franchise changed its name in 2014 from Phoenix to Arizona Coyotes

Post-season series win droughts

1 franchise renamed in 2014 as Arizona Coyotes
2 includes 9 seasons of the Winnipeg Jets (1987–88 through to 1995–96) + 14 seasons of the Phoenix Coyotes (1996–97 through to 2010–11)
3 includes 11 seasons for Atlanta Thrashers (1999–2000 through to 2010–11) + 6 seasons for Winnipeg Jets (2011–12 through to 2016–17)
4 includes 11 seasons of the Hartford Whalers (1986–87 through to 1996–97) + 4 season of the Carolina Hurricanes (1997–98) through to 2000–01

Stanley Cup Finals droughts

1 includes 17 seasons for Winnipeg Jets (1979–80 through to 1995–96) + 25 seasons for Phoenix Coyotes (1996–97 through to 2021–22)

Stanley Cup droughts

1 it is common to refer to the duration of the New York Rangers' record Stanley Cup drought as 54 "years" (1940 to 1994), but that only encompasses 53 seasons (1940–41 to 1992–93).
2 the name of the team was Black Hawks for a majority of the drought (25 of the 47 seasons) before being renamed to Blackhawks in 1986.
3 includes 17 seasons for Winnipeg Jets (1979–80 through to 1995–96) + 25 seasons for Phoenix/Arizona Coyotes (1996–97 through to 2021–22)

Cities/regions awaiting first Stanley Cup

This list only includes cities/regions currently hosting an NHL franchise.

1 includes 26 seasons of the Minnesota North Stars (1967–68 through to 1992–93) and 20 seasons of the Minnesota Wild (2000–01 through to 2020–21).
2 both Stanley Cup Finals appearances by the Minnesota North Stars.
3 includes 9 seasons of the California Seals, Oakland Seals, California Golden Seals franchise (1967–68 through to 1975–76) and 30 seasons of the San Jose Sharks (1991–92 through to 2021–22).
 Although the Vancouver Canucks have not won a Stanley Cup in their 50 seasons of play (inception of franchise in 1970–71 through to 2020–21), Vancouver has one Stanley Cup to its credit - the Vancouver Millionaires of the Pacific Coast Hockey Association won the Stanley Cup in 1915 prior to the founding of the NHL in 1917.
 While the current Ottawa Senators have never won the Stanley Cup in their 27 seasons of play (inception of franchise in 1992–93 through to 2019–20), Ottawa celebrated 11 Stanley Cup championships with the original era Ottawa Senators, the last one in 1927.
 While neither team called the Winnipeg Jets ever won the Stanley Cup in their combined 26 seasons playing in Winnipeg (as of 2019–20), the city celebrated three Stanley Cup championships by the Winnipeg Victorias, the last in 1902, prior to the founding of the NHL in 1917.
 The Seattle Kraken began play in 2021–22; however, the city of Seattle has one prior Stanley Cup championship as the Seattle Metropolitans of the Pacific Coast Hockey Association became the first U.S.-based team to win the Stanley Cup in 1917.

Canadian droughts
Despite having fewer Canadian-based teams than U.S.-based ones throughout much of the NHL's existence (dating back to the Original Six era when it was two Canadian clubs to four American ones, and now seven to twenty-five since 2021), there have been only two times in league history where none of the Canadian teams qualified for the postseason: 1969–70 and 2015–16. The 1992–93 Montreal Canadiens remain the last Canadian club to go all the way and win the Stanley Cup.

 Last time that no Canadian teams qualified for the playoffs: 2015–16
 Last all-Canadian first round series: 2020–21 (Toronto vs. Montreal and Edmonton vs. Winnipeg)
Last all-Canadian first round series without North Division: 2014–15 (Montreal vs. Ottawa and Vancouver vs. Calgary)
 Last time all the Canadian teams were eliminated in the first round: 2018–19 (Calgary, Toronto, Winnipeg)
 Last all-Canadian second round series: 2021–22 (Calgary vs. Edmonton)
 Last time all the Canadian teams were eliminated by the end of the second round: 2019–20 (Vancouver)
 Last Conference Finals appearance by a Canadian team: 2021–22 (Edmonton)
 Last all-Canadian Conference Finals: 1993–94 (Toronto vs. Vancouver)
 Last Stanley Cup Finals appearance by a Canadian team: 2020–21 (Montreal)
 Last all-Canadian Stanley Cup Finals: 1988–89 (Calgary vs. Montreal)
 Last Stanley Cup won by a Canadian team: 1992–93 (Montreal)

See also
List of NHL franchise post-season appearance streaks
List of MLB franchise post-season droughts
List of NBA franchise post-season droughts
List of NFL franchise post-season droughts

References

Post-season droughts
Post-season droughts
NHL
Post-season droughts